is a Japanese sweet made of azuki bean paste sandwiched between two thin crisp wafers made from mochi. The wafers can have the shape of a square, a triangle, or may be shaped like cherry blossoms, chrysanthemums, and so on.

The azuki bean paste filling in monaka can contain sesame seeds, chestnuts, or rice cake (mochi). Modern monaka can have an ice cream filling instead of azuki bean paste. Choco Monaka Jumbo is an ice cream product made with an ice cream and chocolate filling inside the traditional mochi wafers. It was created in 1972 and is produced by Morinaga.

Monaka is a type of dessert (wagashi) which is served with tea. There are still many very famous monaka specialty stores in Japan.

References 

Japanese cuisine
Wagashi
Ice cream sandwiches